Astle  is an English surname of multiple origins.

Astle may also refer to:

Places
 Astle, New Brunswick, a community in the Canadian province of New Brunswick
 Astle, Cheshire East, England; see list of United Kingdom locations
 Astle Hall, a country house in Cheshire, England; see also Chelford Manor House
 Astle Park, in Cheshire, England

See also
 Astley (disambiguation)